This is a complete full list artists who have recorded for Ninja Tune Records.
Listed in parentheses are names of Ninja Tune affiliated labels, under which the artist recorded 
(Big Dada, Brainfeeder, Counter Audio, Girls Music, Motion Audio and Ntone).



 Last updated on 21 April 2012

A
 Airborn Audio
 Ammoncontact
 Amon Tobin 
 Andreya Triana 
 Animals on Wheels 
 Antibalas Afrobeat Orchestra 
 Antipop Consortium  (Big Dada)
 Apple

B
 Bang On!  (Big Dada)
 Blockhead
 Bogus Order
 Bonobo 
 The Bug 
 Busdriver (Big Dada)

C
 Chris Bowden
 The Cinematic Orchestra 
 Clifford Gilberto
 Clusterfunk
 Coldcut

D
 Daedelus (Brainfeeder/Ninja Tune)
 The Death Set 
 Deco Child
 DELS (Big Dada)
 Diplo (Big Dada)
 DJ Food 
 DJ Kentaro 
 DJ Vadim
 DK
 Dorian Concept 
 The Dragons
 Dwight Trible
 Dynamic Syncopation 
 DSP
 Dwight Trible

E
 Emika
 Eskmo
 Euphoreal

F
 FaltyDL 
 Fink 
 Flanger
 Floating Points 
 Fog 
 Funki Porcini

G
 Gideon
 Ghislain Poirier
 Grasscut

H
 The Heavy 
 The Herbaliser 
 Hex 
 Hexstatic 
 Hint 
 Homelife
 Hot Sugar

I
 Igor Boxx 
 Illuminati of Hedfunk
 The Invisible 
 The Irresistible Force

J
 Jade
 Jaga Jazzist 
 Jammer 
 Juice Aleem

K
 Kid Koala 
 King Cannibal
 King Geedorah MF DOOM (Big Dada)
 KT and Hex

L
 Lapalux
 Letherette 
 Loka
 London Funk Allstars 
 The Long Lost 
 Lorn (Brainfeeder/Ninja Tune)

M
 Max & Harvey
 Mr. Scruff (Ninja Tuna)

N
 Neotropic
 Nonplace Urban Field
 NW1 & Born 2 B

O
 One Self

P
 Plug
 Poirier
 Pest
 Please
 Producers for Bob

Q
 The Qemists

R
 Raffertie 
 Rainstick Orchestra 
 Roots Manuva (Big Dada)

S
 Shuttle
 Sixtoo 
 Skalpel 
 Slugabed 
 Spank Rock (Big Dada)
 Speech Debelle (Big Dada)
 Starkey
 Stateless 
 Steinski and Mass Media 
 Sticky (Big Dada)
 Super Numeri

T
 T Love
 Toddla T 
 Treva Whateva
 Ty (Big Dada)

U
 Ulanbator  
 Up, Bustle and Out

W
 Wagon Christ
 Wiley (Big Dada)

Y
 Yppah

Z
 Zero dB

0-9
 9 Lazy 9

See also
 List of record labels
 List of independent UK record labels

References

External links
 Official site
 Official site
 Ping Pong Promotion agency of Big Dada in France.

 

cs:Ninja Tune
de:Ninja Tune
es:Ninja Tune
fr:Ninja Tune
it:Ninja Tune
nl:Ninja Tune
no:Ninja Tunes
pl:Ninja Tune
pt:Ninja Tune
ru:Ninja Tune
fi:Ninja Tune
sv:Ninja Tune
th:นินจาจูน